In mathematics,  the Ackermann ordinal  is a certain large countable ordinal, named after Wilhelm Ackermann.  The term "Ackermann ordinal" is also occasionally used for the small Veblen ordinal, a somewhat larger ordinal. 

Unfortunately there is no standard notation for ordinals beyond the Feferman–Schütte ordinal Γ0. Most systems of notation use symbols such as ψ(α), θ(α), ψα(β), some of which are modifications of the Veblen functions to produce countable ordinals even for uncountable arguments, and some of which are "collapsing functions". The last one is an extension of the Veblen functions for more than 2 arguments.

References

Ordinal numbers